The Nishisonogi Peninsula (西彼杵半島 Nishi-sonogi hantō) is a peninsula in northwest Kyūshū, Japan. It is the north-northwesterly fork of a larger peninsula which also includes Nagasaki and the Nomo Peninsula. To its west is the East China Sea, while to the east it encloses Ōmura Bay.

External links 
 Yorifunebana:Northernmost point

Peninsulas of Japan
Landforms of Nagasaki Prefecture